Jill Halfpenny (born 15 July 1975) is an English actress. Her notable roles include Rebecca Hopkins in ITV soap opera Coronation Street (1999–2000), Kate Mitchell in BBC One soap opera EastEnders (2002–2005), Izzie Redpath in Waterloo Road (2006–2007), and Diane Manning in In The Club (2014–2016). She won the second series of the television dance contest Strictly Come Dancing in 2004.

Career
She began her acting career in 1989 at the age of 14 in the BBC television children's drama series Byker Grove, filmed in the Benwell area of Newcastle upon Tyne. Her other early work has included a recurring role as Kelly in Peak Practice in 1999, plus appearances in Dalziel and Pascoe, Barbara and Coronation Street for television and theatre with the acclaimed Hull Truck Theatre Company. In 2002, Halfpenny took the major role of Kate Mitchell in the BBC One soap opera EastEnders, where her character was introduced as a police officer sent to spy on Phil Mitchell, but after her cover was blown she quit the police force, married Phil and opened a nail salon. Her final scenes were broadcast in January 2005 after her character was axed.

In 2004, Halfpenny participated in the BBC One pro-celebrity ballroom dancing competition Strictly Come Dancing, dancing with professional Darren Bennett. The couple won the competition after receiving the full 40 marks from the judges in the final. On 14 December 2004, Halfpenny and Darren Bennett made an appearance on stage at the Royal Variety Performance which took place at the London Coliseum. In a special one-off Christmas programme which pitted the Strictly Come Dancing champions (and other top performing couples) from series one and two against each other, Jill and Darren were crowned as Champions of Champions. In December, it was announced that she would take the role of Roxie Hart in the West End musical Chicago, starting in January 2005.

In 2005, Halfpenny appeared in The Bodies, a new play adapted from an Émile Zola novel by Peter Flannery at the Live Theatre, Newcastle, opposite her real-life husband, actor Craig Conway. In 2005 and 2006, Halfpenny appeared in hit pantomimes at the Theatre Royal, Newcastle. Halfpenny was the guest presenter for and performed in the first show of the BBC four-part series The Sound of Musicals in January 2006 and played Roxy Ball in Shameless in an episode broadcast on 31 January 2006. In 2006, Halfpenny made a guest appearance in an episode of The Catherine Tate Show.

From spring 2006, Halfpenny appeared in the BBC One school-based drama series Waterloo Road as drama teacher Izzie Redpath, a role for which she won the TV Quick Award for "Best Actress". Her character was killed-off at the end of the second series. In 2007 Halfpenny appeared as the narrator of Freaky Eaters for BBC Three and Fat Man's Warning for Channel 4. She narrated a short film advertising how the National Lottery helps the North East, created by students at the Lord Lawson of Beamish School as part of a competition. The film they created won the competition.

From the beginning of February 2008, a pregnant Halfpenny played Spike Milligan's long-suffering manager, Norma Farnes, alongside Michael Barrymore in Surviving Spike at the Theatre Royal, Windsor. Halfpenny starred in the West End production of Calendar Girls from 28 July to 31 October 2009, and then played the part of Paulette Bonafonté in the West End company of Legally Blonde, which opened in January 2010 with previews beginning in December 2009. She played the part until late October 2010 and she was succeeded by Denise van Outen. For this role Halfpenny won the whatsonstage.com Theatregoers' Choice Award for Best Supporting Actress in a Musical and won the Laurence Olivier Award for Best Performance in a Supporting Role in a Musical.

Halfpenny made a guest appearance in the Canadian series Murdoch Mysteries, in episode one of the fifth series, first broadcast in 2012.

In March 2012 she starred in a revival of Mike Leigh's 1977 play Abigail's Party at the Menier Chocolate Factory in London. In April the show played at the Theatre Royal, Bath, before transferring to the West End at Wyndham's Theatre, where it ran from May to September. In 2014 she starred in BBC drama In the Club, which returned for a second series in 2016, and Channel 4's Babylon.

In September 2014, along with Tim Healy, Halfpenny narrated the history of the north-east of England as part of the ceremony for the Great North Run. In 2015 she starred in Way Upstream by Alan Ayckbourn at Chichester Festival Theatre, and in the same year starred in the first series of Humans.

Since 2017 she has been a radio broadcaster for BBC Radio 2, working alongside Sara Cox. In 2018, she covered the Good Morning Sunday show for August.

Theatre
She has also enjoyed a successful theatre career, with roles ranging from pantomime to the West End, in productions including Uncle Vanya, Calendar Girls, Abigail's Party, and Chicago. In 2011, she won the Theatregoers' Choice Award for Best Supporting Actress in a Musical and the Laurence Olivier Award for Best Performance in a Supporting Role in a Musical for her portrayal of Paulette in Legally Blonde.

In 2018, she was cast to perform in The Girl on the Train stage adaptation in Leeds, which premiered at West Yorkshire Playhouse in May.

Personal life
Halfpenny married fellow actor Craig Conway in 2007; together they have one child. The couple divorced in 2010. 

She is an ambassador for children's charity Kidscape, and in 2013 was awarded "Freeman of the Borough of Gateshead".

Filmography

References

External links 
 

Alumni of the Webber Douglas Academy of Dramatic Art
BBC Radio 2 presenters
English musical theatre actresses
English soap opera actresses
English stage actresses
English television actresses
English people of Irish descent
Laurence Olivier Award winners
Actors from Gateshead
Actresses from Tyne and Wear
Actors from County Durham
Strictly Come Dancing winners
1975 births
Living people